Char Bangla Temples, are located at Baranagar in the Murshidabad-Jiaganj CD block in the Lalbag subdivision of Murshidabad district in the Indian state of West Bengal.

Geography

Location

The temples
David J. McCutchion mentions the Char Bangla Temples at Baranagar as ek-bangla temples with triple entrance, measuring 31’ x 15–16.5’. The northern temple is dated 1760. Two of the temples have rich terracotta façade, one has incised plaster and the fourth one is plain. He says that apart from the Baranagar group, the ek-bangla is hardly found in West Bengal except in a “cursory form”

According to the List of Monuments of National Importance in West Bengal the Char Bangla group of four Siva Mandirs are ASI listed monuments.

History
The temples were built by Rani Bhabani of Natore. The temples are famous for their exquisite decorations based on either mythology or daily life. The tendency of the Ganges to change course frequently is threatening the existence of these heritage structures. The river, which earlier used to flow some distance away is now within yards from the temples.

Char Bangla picture gallery

The temples

Decoration

References

External links

Hindu temples in West Bengal
Monuments of National Importance in West Bengal